Allocasuarina huegeliana, commonly known as rock sheoak or sighing sheoak, is a tree in the family Casuarinaceae.  Endemic to Western Australia, it occurs mostly throughout the Wheatbelt region.  It is now especially common on road verges, where it sometimes forms thickets.

Description
The dark coloured bark is longitudinally fissured. It has sparse foliage that forms a rounded outline. Sometimes it branches at ground level, but usually has a bole of a few metres. As with other Allocasuarina species, the foliage consists of slender green branchlets informally referred to as "needles" but more correctly termed cladodes. These are segmented, and the true leaves are reduced to tiny teeth encircling each joint. Male trees have small brown flower spikes at the end of branchlets. Female trees bear small flowers on short branchlets of their own. The red to brown coloured flowers appear between May and January.

Classification
Rock Sheoak was first collected on Mount Brown near York in 1840 by Ludwig Preiss.  The specific name huegeliana honours the Austrian naturalist Baron Carl von Huegel. 
The species was first described by the botanist Friedrich Anton Wilhelm Miquel as Casuarina huegeliana in 1845 as part of the Johann Georg Christian Lehmann work Casuarinaceae. Plantae Preissianae, it as later reclassified to the current genera by Lawrence Alexander Sidney Johnson in 1982 in the work Notes on Casuarinaceae II published in the Journal of the Adelaide Botanic Gardens. The common name "rock sheoak" refers to its habitat, which often contains granite rocks.  The alternative common name "sighing sheoak" alludes to the sound of the wind in the foliage.

Distribution
The species is common throughout south west Western Australia and to the north in the Mid West through the Wheatbelt, Peel, South West, Great Southern and the southern Goldfields-Esperance regions. It is found as far north as the Murchison River extending through to the southern coastline although populations are fragmented. It grows in sandy to sandy-loam soils and is mostly associated with granite substrate or outcrops.
It is also used as host species in Sandalwood plantations

Cultivation
A. huegeliana is a moderate to fast growing tree that is nitrogen fixing. It can be grown as a windbreak. The species thrives in well-drained soils but will do poorly in saline or poorly drained areas. The attractive and dense wood from the tree is used to make specialty furniture while the foliage is used by grazing stock as fodder. The species is drought and frost tolerant but will be killed by fire. Trees can live up an age of over 15 years.

Notes

References

 
 

huegeliana
Rosids of Western Australia
Fagales of Australia
Plants described in 1845
Dioecious plants